Types of socialism include a range of economic and social systems characterised by social ownership and democratic control of the means of production and organizational self-management of enterprises as well as the political theories and movements associated with socialism. Social ownership may refer to forms of public, collective or cooperative ownership, or to citizen ownership of equity in which surplus value goes to the working class and hence society as a whole. There are many varieties of socialism and no single definition encapsulates all of them, but social ownership is the common element shared by its various forms. Socialists disagree about the degree to which social control or regulation of the economy is necessary, how far society should intervene, and whether government, particularly existing government, is the correct vehicle for change.

As a term, socialism represents a broad range of theoretical and historical socioeconomic systems and has also been used by many political movements throughout history to describe themselves and their goals, generating a variety of socialism types. Socialist economic systems can be further divided into market and non-market forms. The first type of socialism utilize markets for allocating inputs and capital goods among economic units. In the second type of socialism, planning is utilized and include a system of accounting based on calculation-in-kind to value resources and goods wherein production is carried out directly for use.

There have been numerous political movements such as anarchism, communism, the labour movement, Marxism, social democracy, national socialism and syndicalism, whose members called themselves socialists under some definition of the term—some of these interpretations are mutually exclusive and all of them have generated debates over the true meaning of socialism. Different self-described socialists have used socialism to refer to different things such as an economic system, a type of society, a philosophical outlook, an ethical socialism in the form of a collection of moral values and ideals, or a certain kind of human character. Some of those definitions of socialism are very vague while others are so specific that they only include a small minority of the things that have been described as socialism in the past such as a mode of production, state socialism, or the abolition of wage labour.

Early interpretations 
The term socialism was coined in the 1830s and it was first used to refer to philosophical or moral beliefs rather than any specific political views. Alexandre Vinet, who claimed to have been the first person to use the term, defined socialism simply as "the opposite of individualism". Robert Owen also viewed socialism as a matter of ethics, although he used it with a slightly more specific meaning to refer to the view that human society can and should be improved for the benefit of all. In a similar vein, Pierre-Joseph Proudhon claimed that socialism is "every aspiration towards the amelioration of society".

In the first half of the 19th century, many writers who described themselves as socialists—and who would be later called utopian socialists—wrote down descriptions of what they believed to be the ideal human society. Some of them also created small communities that put their ideals into practice. A constant feature of these ideal societies was social and economic equality. Because the people who proposed the creation of such societies called themselves socialists, the term socialism came to refer not only to a certain moral doctrine, but also to a type of egalitarian society based on such a doctrine.

Other early advocates of socialism took a more scientific approach by favouring social leveling to create a meritocratic society based upon freedom for individual talent to prosper. One of those was Count Henri de Saint-Simon, who was fascinated by the enormous potential of science and technology and believed a socialist society would eliminate the disorderly aspects of capitalism. He advocated the creation of a society in which each person was ranked according to his or her capacities and rewarded according to his or her work. The key focus of this early socialism was on administrative efficiency and industrialism and a belief that science was the key to progress. Simon's ideas provided a foundation for scientific economic planning and technocratic administration of society.

Other early socialist thinkers such as Charles Hall and Thomas Hodgskin based their ideas on David Ricardo's economic theories. They reasoned that the equilibrium value of commodities approximated to prices charged by the producer when those commodities were in elastic supply and that these producer prices corresponded to the embodied labor, i.e. the cost of the labor (essentially the wages paid) that was required to produce the commodities. The Ricardian socialists viewed profit, interest and rent as deductions from this exchange-value. These ideas embodied early conceptions of market socialism.

After the advent of Karl Marx's theory of capitalism and scientific socialism, socialism came to refer to ownership and administration of the means of production by the working class, either through the state apparatus or through independent cooperatives. In Marxist theory, socialism refers to a specific stage of social and economic development that will displace capitalism, characterized by coordinated production, public or cooperative ownership of capital, diminishing class conflict and inequalities that spawn from such and the end of wage-labor with a method of compensation based on the principle of "From each according to his ability, to each according to his contribution".

Differences between various schools 
Although they share a common root (as elaborated upon in the above sections), schools of socialism are divided on many issues and sometimes there is a split within a school. The following is a brief overview of the major issues which have generated or are generating significant controversy amongst socialists in general.

Theory 
Some branches of socialism arose largely as a philosophical construct (e.g. utopian socialism)—others in the heat of a revolution (e.g. early Marxism or Leninism). A few arose merely as the product of a ruling party (e.g. Stalinism), other as a product or various worker movements (e.g. anarcho-syndicalism), or a party or other group contending for political power in a democratic society (e.g. social democracy).

Some are in favour of a socialist revolution (e.g. Maoism, Marxism–Leninism, revolutionary socialism, social anarchism and Trotskyism) whilst others tend to support reform instead (e.g. Fabianism and individualist anarchism). Others believe both are possible (e.g. syndicalism or various forms of Marxism). The first utopian socialists even failed to address the question of how a socialist society would be achieved, upholding the belief that technology was a necessity for a socialist society and that they themselves had no comprehension of the technology of the future.

All socialists criticize the current system in some way. Some criticisms center on the ownership of the means of production (e.g. Marxism) whereas others tend to focus on the nature of mass and equitable distribution (e.g. most forms of utopian socialism). Most are opposed to unchecked industrialism as well as capitalism (e.g. green left) and believe that under socialism the environment must be protected. Utopian socialists like Robert Owen and Henri de Saint-Simon argued, although not from exactly the same perspective, that the injustice and widespread poverty of the societies they lived in were a problem of distribution of the goods created. On the other hand, Marxian socialists determined that the root of the injustice is based not in the function of distribution of goods already created, but rather in the fact that the ownership of the means of production is in the hands of the upper class. Marxian socialists also maintain in contrast to the utopian socialists that the root of injustice is not in how goods (commodities) are distributed, but for whose economic benefit are they produced and sold.

Practice 
Most forms and derivatives of Marxism and anarchism advocated total or near-total socialization of the economy. Less radical schools (e.g. Reformism and reformist Marxism) proposed a mixed market economy instead. Mixed economies can in turn range anywhere from those developed by the social democratic governments that have periodically governed Northern and Western European countries, to the inclusion of small cooperatives in the planned economy of Yugoslavia under Josip Broz Tito. A related issue is whether it is better to reform capitalism to create a fairer society (e.g. most social democrats) or to totally overthrow the capitalist system (all Marxists).

Some schools advocate centralized state control of the socialized sectors of the economy (e.g. Leninism), whilst others argue for control of those sectors by workers' councils (e.g. anarcho-communism, council communism, left communism, Marxism or syndicalism). This question is usually referred to by socialists in terms of "ownership of the means of production". None of the social democratic parties of Europe advocate total state ownership of the means of production in their contemporary demands and popular press.

Another issue socialists are divided on is what legal and political apparatus the workers would maintain and further develop the socialization of the means of production. Some advocate that the power of the workers' councils should itself constitute the basis of a socialist state (coupled with direct democracy and the widespread use of referendums), but others hold that socialism entails the existence of a legislative body administered by people who would be elected in a representative democracy.

Different ideologies support different governments. During the era of the Soviet Union, Western socialists were bitterly divided as to whether the Soviet Union was actually socialist, moving toward socialism, or inherently unsocialist and in fact inimical to true socialism. Similarly, today the government of the People's Republic of China claims to be socialist and refers to its own approach as socialism with Chinese characteristics, but many other socialists consider modern China to be essentially capitalist. The Chinese leadership concurs with most of the usual critiques against a command economy and many of their actions to manage what they call a socialist economy have been determined by this opinion.

Socialist planned economy 
This form of socialism combines public ownership and management of the means of production with centralized state planning and can refer to a broad range of economic systems from the centralized Soviet-style command economy to participatory planning via workplace democracy. In a centrally-planned economy decisions regarding the quantity of goods and services to be produced as well as the allocation of output (distribution of goods and services) are planned in advance by a planning agency. This type of economic system was often combined with a one-party political system and is associated with the Communist states of the 20th century.

State-directed economy 
A state-directed economy is a system where either the state or worker cooperatives own the means of production, but economic activity is directed to some degree by a government agency or planning ministry through mechanisms such as indicative planning or dirigisme. This differs from a centralized planned economy, or a command economy, in that micro-economic decision making, such as quantity to be produced and output requirements, is left to managers and workers in state enterprises or cooperative enterprises rather than being mandated by a comprehensive economic plan from a centralized planning board. However, the state will plan long-term strategic investment and some aspect of production. It is possible for a state-directed economy to have elements of both a market and planned economy. For example, production and investment decisions may be semi-planned by the state, but distribution of output may be determined by the market mechanism.

State-directed socialism can also refer to technocratic socialism—economic systems that rely on technocratic management and technocratic planning mechanisms, along with public ownership of the means of production. A forerunner of this concept was Henri de Saint-Simon, who understood the state would undergo a transformation in a socialist system and change its role from one of "political administration of men, to the administration of things".

Elements of state-directed socialist economies include dirigisme, economic planning, state socialism and technocracy.

Decentralized planned economy 
A decentralized planned economy is one where ownership of enterprises is accomplished through various forms of self-management and worker cooperatives in which planning of production and distribution is done from the bottom-up by local worker councils in a democratic manner. This form of socialist economy is related to the political philosophies of libertarian socialism, syndicalism and various forms of communal utopian socialism.

Examples of decentralized democratic planning include council communism, individualist anarchism, industrial democracy, participatory economics, Soviet democracy and syndicalism.

Market socialism 

Market socialism refers to various economic systems that involve either public ownership and management or worker cooperative ownership over the means of production, or a combination of both, and the market mechanism for allocating economic output, deciding what to produce and in what quantity. In state-oriented forms of market socialism where state enterprises attempt to maximize profit, the profits can fund government programs and services eliminating or greatly diminishing the need for various forms of taxation that exist in capitalist systems.

Some forms of market socialism are based on neoclassical economic theory, with the aim of attaining pareto efficiency by setting price to equal marginal cost in public enterprises. This form of socialism was promoted by Oskar Lange, Abba Lerner and Fredrick Taylor. Other forms of market socialism are based on classical economics, such as those advocated by Thomas Hodgskin, who viewed interest accumulation, rent and profit as deductions from exchange-value, so that eliminating the capitalist element from the economy would lead to a free market and socialism. The term market socialism has also been applied to planned economic systems that try to organize themselves partially along market-lines while retaining centralized state ownership of capital.

Examples of market socialism include economic democracy, the Lange model, liberal socialism, market-oriented left-libertarianism, mutualism the New Economic Mechanism and Ricardian socialism. Other types of market socialist systems such as mutualism are related to the political philosophy of libertarian socialism.

Socialist market economy 
A socialist market economy refers to the economic systems adopted by the People's Republic of China and the Socialist Republic of Vietnam, and previously also Yugoslavia. Although there is dispute as to whether or not these models actually constitute state capitalism, the decisive means of production remain under state-ownership. State enterprises are organized into corporations (corporatization) and operate like private capitalist enterprises. A substantial private sector exists alongside the state sector of the economy, but it plays a secondary role usually relegated to the service sector and production of consumer goods.

Examples of socialist market economies include the socialist market economy with Chinese characteristics and the socialist-oriented market economy.

Socialist ideologies

Utopian socialism 

Utopian socialism is a term used to define the first currents of modern socialist thought as exemplified by the work of Henri de Saint-Simon, Charles Fourier and Robert Owen, which inspired Karl Marx and other early socialists. Although it is technically possible for any set of ideas or any person living at any time in history to be a utopian socialist, the term is most often applied to those socialists who lived in the first quarter of the 19th century who were ascribed the label "utopian" by later socialists as a negative term, in order to imply naivete and dismiss their ideas as fanciful or unrealistic. Later socialists argued that visions of imaginary ideal societies, which competed with revolutionary social democratic movements, were not grounded in the material conditions of society and were therefore "reactionary". Forms of socialism which existed in traditional societies, including pre-Marxist communism are referred to as primitive communism by Marxists.

Sociocracy is a socialist-positivist political view created by Auguste Comte, based on Saint-Simon's aristocratic, utopian socialist heritage, prioritizing social justice and a central government with direct democracy without parliament. Religious sects whose members live communally, such as the Hutterites, for example, are not usually called "utopian socialists", although their way of living is a prime example. They have been categorized as religious socialists by some. Similarly, modern intentional communities based on socialist ideas could also be categorized as "utopian socialist".

While Marxism had a significant impact on socialist thought, pre-Marxist thinkers (before Marx wrote on the subject) have advocated socialism in forms both similar and in stark contrast to Marx and Friedrich Engels' conception of socialism, advocating some form of collective ownership over large-scale production, worker-management within the workplace, or in some cases a form of planned economy. Early socialist philosophers and political theorists included Gerrard Winstanley, who founded the Diggers movement in the United Kingdom; Charles Fourier, French philosopher who propounded principles very similar to that of Marx; Louis Blanqui, French socialist and writer; Marcus Thrane, Norwegian socialist; Jean-Jacques Rousseau, Genevan philosopher, writer and composer whose works influenced the French Revolution; and Pierre-Joseph Proudhon, French politician writer.

Pre-Marx socialists also included Ricardian socialist economists such as Thomas Hodgskin, English Ricardian socialist and free-market anarchist; Charles Hall; John Francis Bray; John Gray; William Thompson; Percy Ravenstone; James Mill; and John Stuart Mill, classical political economist who came to advocate worker-cooperative socialism. Utopian socialist thinkers included Henri de Saint-Simon, Wilhelm Weitling, Robert Owen, Charles Fourier and Étienne Cabet.

Communism 

Communism (from Latin , "common, universal") is a philosophical, social, political, economic ideology and movement whose ultimate goal is the establishment of a communist society, namely a socioeconomic order structured upon the ideas of common ownership of the means of production and the absence of social classes, money and the state. Along with social democracy, communism became the dominant political tendency within the international socialist movement by the 1920s. While the emergence of the Soviet Union as the world's first nominally communist state led to communism's widespread association with the Soviet economic model and Marxism–Leninism, some economists and intellectuals argued that in practice the model functioned as a form of state capitalism, or a non-planned administrative or command economy.

Communism has usually been distinguished from socialism since the 1840s. The modern definition and usage of socialism settled by the 1860s, becoming the predominant term among the group of words associationist, co-operative and mutualist which had previously been used as synonyms. Instead, communism fell out of use during this period. An early distinction between communism and socialism was that the latter aimed to only socialise production while the former aimed to socialise both production and consumption (in the form of free access to final goods). However, Marxists employed socialism in place of communism by 1888 which had come to be considered an old-fashion synonym for socialism. It was not until 1917 after the Bolshevik Revolution that socialism came to refer to a distinct stage between capitalism and communism, introduced by Vladimir Lenin as a means to defend the Bolshevik seizure of power against traditional Marxist criticism that Russia's productive forces were not sufficiently developed for socialist revolution. A distinction between communist and socialist as descriptors of political ideologies arose in 1918 after the Russian Social-Democratic Labour Party renamed itself to the All-Russian Communist Party, where communist came to specifically mean socialists who supported the politics and theories of Bolshevism, Leninism and later Marxism–Leninism, although communist parties continued to describe themselves as socialists dedicated to socialism.

Both communism and socialism eventually accorded with the adherents' and opponents' cultural attitude towards religion. In Christian Europe, communism was believed to be the atheist way of life. In Protestant England, communism was too culturally and aurally close to the Roman Catholic communion rite, hence English atheists denoted themselves socialists. Friedrich Engels argued that in 1848, at the time when The Communist Manifesto was first published, "socialism was respectable on the continent, while communism was not". The Owenites in England and the Fourierists in France were considered respectable socialists while working-class movements that "proclaimed the necessity of total social change" denoted themselves communists. This latter branch of socialism produced the communist work of Étienne Cabet in France and Wilhelm Weitling in Germany.

The dominant forms of communism are based on Marxism, but non-Marxist versions of communism such as anarcho-communism and Christian communism also exist. According to The Oxford Handbook of Karl Marx, "Marx used many terms to refer to a post-capitalist society—positive humanism, socialism, Communism, realm of free individuality, free association of producers, etc. He used these terms completely interchangeably. The notion that "socialism" and "Communism" are distinct historical stages is alien to his work and only entered the lexicon of Marxism after his death".

Marxism 

Marxism, or Marxist communism, refers to classless, stateless social organization based upon common ownership of the means of production and to a variety of movements acting in the name of this goal which are influenced by the thought of Karl Marx. In general, the classless forms of social organisation are not capitalised while movements associated with official communist parties and communist states usually are. In the classic Marxist definition (pure communism), a communist economy refers to a system that has achieved a superabundance of goods and services due to an increase in technological capability and advances in the productive forces and therefore has transcended socialism such as a post-scarcity economy. This is a hypothetical stage of social and economic development with few speculative details known about it.

The actual goal of communism has never been attained in practice from a Marxist position, though anarchist societies have provided a glimpse of what a communist world would look like. The real idea behind it is to abolish all leadership, and govern with a commune. That is, the people themselves make all decisions, and everyone contributing to the wellbeing of the commune. Communist state is used by Western historians, political scientists and media to refer to these countries and distinguish them from other socialist states. In practice, most governments that have claimed to be communists have not described themselves as a communist state nor they claimed to have achieved communism or communist society. Those states have referred to themselves as socialist states (i.e. states that are constitutionally socialist) that are in the process of constructing socialism.

The modern political Marxist communist movement was created when the social democratic parties of Europe split between their rightist and leftist tendencies during World War I. The leftists, led internationally by Vladimir Lenin, Rosa Luxemburg and Karl Liebknecht, to distinguish their brand of socialism from the "reformist" social democrats, were called "communists". However, after Luxemburg's and Liebknecht's murders the term communist became generally associated solely with the parties and organisations following Lenin, along with their various derivations, such as Stalinism or Maoism.

There is a considerable variety of views among self-identified communists. However, Marxism and Leninism, schools of communism associated with Karl Marx and of Vladimir Lenin respectively, have the distinction of having been a major force in world politics since the early 20th century. Class struggle plays a central role in Marxism. This theory views the formation of communism as the culmination of the class struggle between the capitalist class, the owners of most of the capital and the working class. Marx held that society could not be transformed from the capitalist mode of production to the communist mode of production all at once, but required a transitional state which Marx described as the revolutionary dictatorship of the proletariat.

Some forms of the communist society that Marx envisioned, as emerging from capitalism, have been claimed to be achieved for limited periods during certain historical moments and under certain circumstances. For example, the Paris Commune in fact let Marx reinforce and implement his theories by adapting them to a real experience he could draw from. Another similar case, though disputed by anarcho-syndicalism or even anarchism, was the Spanish Revolution of 1936 (often missed or unmentioned by official historiography), during which much of Spain's economy in most of Republican areas, some of which enjoyed a practical absence of state, was put under workers' direct collective control.

In addition to this, the term communism (as well as socialism) is often used to refer to those political and economic systems and states dominated by a political, bureaucratic class, typically attached to one single Communist party that follow Marxist–Leninist doctrines and often claim to represent the dictatorship of the proletariat in a non-democratic fashion, described by critics as in a totalitarian and bureaucratic. These systems are also often called Stalinism, state capitalism, state communism or state socialism.

With the Soviet Union's creation after the end of Russian Civil War that followed to initial success of Red October Revolution in Russia, other socialist parties in other countries and the Bolshevik party itself became Communist parties, owing allegiance of varying degrees to the Communist Party of the Soviet Union (see Communist International). After World War II, regimes calling themselves Communist took power in Eastern Europe. In 1949, the Communists in China, supported by Soviet Union and led by Mao Zedong, came to power and established the People's Republic of China. Among the other countries in the Third World that adopted a bureaucratic Communist state as form of government at some point were Cuba, North Korea, Vietnam, Laos, Angola and Mozambique. By the early 1980s, almost one third of the world's population lived under Communist states.

Communism carries a strong social stigma in the United States due to a history of anti-communism in the United States. Since the early 1970s, the term Eurocommunism was used to refer to the policies of Communist parties in western Europe, which sought to break with the tradition of uncritical and unconditional support of the Soviet Union. Such parties were politically active and electorally significant in France and Italy. With the collapse of the statalized one-party systems and Marxist–Leninist governments, in Eastern Europe from the late 1980s and the breakup of the Soviet Union on December 8, 1991, Marxist–Leninist state communism's influence has decreased dramatically in Europe, but around a quarter of the world's population still lives under such a kind of Communist states.

Leninism and Marxism–Leninism 

Vladimir Lenin never used the term Leninism, nor did he refer to his views as Marxism–Leninism. However, his ideas diverged from classical Marxist theory on several important points (see the articles on Marxism and Leninism for more information). Bolshevik communists saw these differences as advancements of Marxism made by Lenin. After Lenin's death, his ideology and contributions to Marxist theory were termed "Marxism–Leninism", or sometimes only "Leninism". Marxism–Leninism soon became the official name for the ideology of the Comintern and of Communist parties around the world.

Stalinism 

Stalinism was the theory and practice of communism practiced by Joseph Stalin, leader of the Soviet Union from 1928 to 1953. Officially it adhered to Marxism–Leninism, but whether Stalin's practices actually followed the principles of Marx and Lenin is a subject of debate and criticism. In contrast to Marx and Lenin, Stalin made few new theoretical contributions. Stalin's main contributions to communist theory were Socialism in One Country and the theory of aggravation of class struggle under socialism, a theoretical base supporting the repression of political opponents as necessary. Stalinism took an aggressive stance on class conflict, utilizing state violence in an attempt to forcibly purge society of the bourgeoisie. The groundwork for the Soviet policy concerning nationalities was laid out in Stalin's 1913 work Marxism and the National Question.

Stalinist policies in the Soviet Union included rapid industrialization, Five-Year Plans, socialism in one country, a centralized state, collectivization of agriculture and subordination of interests of other communist parties to those of the Communist Party of the Soviet Union. Rapid industrialization was designed to accelerate the development towards communism, stressing that industrialization was needed because the country was economically backward in comparison with other countries, and was needed in order to face the challenges posed by internal and external enemies. Rapid industrialization was accompanied with mass collective farming and rapid urbanization. Rapid urbanization converted many small villages into industrial cities.

Maoism 

A key concept that distinguishes Maoism from other left-wing ideologies is the belief that the class struggle continues throughout the entire socialist period, as a result of the fundamental antagonistic contradiction between capitalism and communism. Even when the proletariat has seized state power through a socialist revolution, the potential remains for a bourgeoisie to restore capitalism. Indeed, Mao famously stated that "the bourgeoisie [in a socialist country] is right inside the Communist Party itself", implying that corrupt Party officials would subvert socialism if not prevented.

Unlike the earlier forms of Marxism–Leninism in which the urban proletariat was seen as the main source of revolution, and the countryside was largely ignored, Mao focused on the peasantry as a revolutionary force which, he said, could be mobilized by a Communist Party with their knowledge and leadership.

Unlike most other political ideologies, including other socialist and Marxist ones, Maoism contains an integral military doctrine and explicitly connects its political ideology with military strategy. In Maoist thought, "political power comes from the barrel of the gun" (one of Mao's quotes), and the peasantry can be mobilized to undertake a "people's war" of armed struggle involving guerrilla warfare.

Since the death of Mao and the reforms of Deng, most of the parties explicitly defining themselves as "Maoist" have disappeared, but various communist groups around the world, particularly armed ones like the Unified Communist Party of Nepal (Maoist), the CPI (Maoist) and CPI (ML) of India and the New People's Army of the Philippines, continue to advance Maoist ideas and get press attention for them. These groups generally have the idea that Mao's ideas were betrayed before they could be fully or properly implemented.

Dengism 

Dengism is a political and economic ideology first developed by Chinese leader Deng Xiaoping. The theory does not claim to reject Marxism–Leninism or Mao Zedong Thought, but instead it seeks to adapt them to the existing socio-economic conditions of China. Deng also stressed opening China to the outside world, the implementation of one country, two systems and through the phrase "seek truth from facts", an advocation of political and economic pragmatism.

As reformist communism and a branch of Maoism, Dengism is often criticized by traditional Maoists. Dengists believe that isolated in our current international order and with an extremely underdeveloped economy it is first and foremost necessary to bridge the gap between China and the West as quickly as possible in order for socialism to be successful (see the theory of primary stage of socialism). In order to encourage and promote the advancement of the productivity by creating competition and innovation, Dengist thought promotes the idea that the PRC needs to introduce market elements into the socialist country. Dengists still believe that China needs public ownership of land, banks, raw materials and strategic industries, but at the same time private ownership is allowed and encouraged in industries of finished goods and services. According to the Dengist theory, private owners in those industries are not a bourgeoisie. Because in accordance with Marxist theory, bourgeois owns land and raw materials. In Dengist theory, private company owners are called civil run enterprises.

China was the first country that adopt this model; although it is vaguely similar to Russia under Lenin with the New Economic Policy. It boosted its economy and achieved the Chinese economic miracle. It had increased the Chinese GDP growth rate to over 8% per year for thirty years and China now has the second highest GDP in the world. Due to the influence of Dengism, Vietnam and Laos have also adopted this belief, allowing Laos to increase its real GDP growth rate to 8.3%. Cuba is also starting to embrace the model. Dengists take a strong position against any form of personality cult, such as what appeared in China under Mao's rule, the Soviet Union during Stalin's rule and the current North Korea under the Kim family.

Trotskyism 

Trotskyism is the theory of Marxism as advocated by Leon Trotsky. Trotsky considered himself a Bolshevik–Leninist, arguing for the establishment of a vanguard party. He considered himself an advocate of orthodox Marxism. His politics differed greatly from those of Stalin or Mao, most importantly in declaring the need for an international "permanent revolution" and arguing that democracy is essential to both socialism and communism. Numerous groups around the world continue to describe themselves as Trotskyist and see themselves as standing in this tradition, although they have diverse interpretations of the conclusions to be drawn from this.

Council communism and left communism 

Council communism, or councilism, is a current of libertarian Marxism that emerged from the November Revolution in the 1920s, characterized by its opposition to state capitalism/state socialism as well as its advocacy of workers' councils as the basis for workers' democracy. Originally affiliated with the Communist Workers Party of Germany (KAPD), council communism continues today as a theoretical and activist position within the greater libertarian socialism movement.

Chief among the tenets of council communism is its opposition to the party vanguardism and democratic centralism of Leninist ideologies and its contention that democratic workers' councils arising in the factories and municipalities are the natural form of working class organization and authority. Council communism also stands in contrast to social democracy through its formal rejection of both the reformism and parliamentarism.

The historical origins of left communism can be traced to the period before World War I, but it only came into focus after 1918. All left communists were supportive of the October Revolution in Russia, but retained a critical view of its development. However, some would in later years come to reject the idea that the revolution had a proletarian or socialist nature, asserting that it had simply carried out the tasks of the bourgeois revolution by creating a state capitalist system.

Autonomism 

Autonomism refers to a set of left-wing political and social movements and theories close to the socialist movement. As an identifiable theoretical system it first emerged in Italy in the 1960s from workerist (operaismo) communism. Later, post-Marxist and anarchist tendencies became significant after influence from the Situationists, the failure of Italian far-left movements in the 1970s, and the emergence of a number of important theorists including Antonio Negri, who had contributed to the 1969 founding of Potere Operaio, Mario Tronti, Paolo Virno, etc.

Unlike other forms of Marxism, autonomist Marxism emphasises the ability of the working class to force changes to the organization of the capitalist system independent of the state, trade unions or political parties. Autonomists are less concerned with party political organization than other Marxists, focusing instead on self-organized action outside of traditional organizational structures. Autonomist Marxism is thus a "bottom up" theory: it draws attention to activities that autonomists see as everyday working class resistance to capitalism, for example absenteeism, slow working, and socialization in the workplace.

Through translations made available by Danilo Montaldi and others, the Italian autonomists drew upon previous activist research in the United States by the Johnson-Forest Tendency and in France by the group Socialisme ou Barbarie.

It influenced the German and Dutch Autonomen, the worldwide Social Centre movement, and today is influential in Italy, France, and to a lesser extent the English-speaking countries. Those who describe themselves as autonomists now vary from Marxists to post-structuralists and anarchists. The Autonomist Marxist and Autonomen movements provided inspiration to some on the revolutionary left in English speaking countries, particularly among anarchists, many of whom have adopted autonomist tactics. Some English-speaking anarchists even describe themselves as Autonomists.

The Italian operaismo movement also influenced Marxist academics such as Harry Cleaver, John Holloway, Steve Wright, and Nick Dyer-Witheford.

Anarchism 

Anarchism is a political philosophy that advocates stateless societies based on non-hierarchical free associations. Anarchism holds the state to be undesirable, unnecessary, or harmful. While anti-statism is central, some argue that anarchism entails opposing authority or hierarchical organization in the conduct of human relations, including, but not limited to, the state system. Anarchism as a social movement has regularly endured fluctuations in popularity. Its classical period, which scholars demarcate as from 1860 to 1939, is associated with the working-class movements of the 19th century and the Spanish Civil War-era struggles against fascism.

In 1864 the International Workingmen's Association (sometimes called the First International) united diverse revolutionary currents including French followers of Proudhon, The anti-authoritarian sections of the First International were the precursors of the anarcho-syndicalists, seeking to "replace the privilege and authority of the State" with the "free and spontaneous organization of labor."

In 1907, the International Anarchist Congress of Amsterdam gathered delegates from 14 countries, among which important figures of the anarchist movement, including Errico Malatesta, Pierre Monatte, Luigi Fabbri, Benoît Broutchoux, Emma Goldman, Rudolf Rocker, and Christiaan Cornelissen. Various themes were treated during the Congress, in particular concerning the organisation of the anarchist movement, popular education issues, the general strike or antimilitarism. A central debate concerned the relation between anarchism and syndicalism (or trade unionism). The Spanish Workers Federation in 1881 was the first major anarcho-syndicalist movement; anarchist trade union federations were of special importance in Spain. The most successful was the Confederación Nacional del Trabajo (National Confederation of Labour: CNT), founded in 1910. Before the 1940s, the CNT was the major force in Spanish working class politics, attracting 1.58 million members at one point and playing a major role in the Spanish Civil War. The CNT was affiliated with the International Workers Association, a federation of anarcho-syndicalist trade unions founded in 1922, with delegates representing two million workers from 15 countries in Europe and Latin America.

Some anarchists, such as Johann Most, advocated publicizing violent acts of retaliation against counter-revolutionaries because "we preach not only action in and for itself, but also action as propaganda." Numerous heads of state were assassinated between 1881 and 1914 by members of the anarchist movement. For example, U.S. President McKinley's assassin Leon Czolgosz claimed to have been influenced by anarchist and feminist Emma Goldman. Anarchists participated alongside the Bolsheviks in both February and October revolutions, and were initially enthusiastic about the Bolshevik coup. However, the Bolsheviks soon turned against the anarchists and other left-wing opposition, a conflict that culminated in the 1921 Kronstadt rebellion which the new government repressed. Anarchists in central Russia were either imprisoned, driven underground or joined the victorious Bolsheviks; the anarchists from Petrograd and Moscow fled to Ukraine. There, in the Makhnovshchina, they fought in the civil war against the Whites (a Western-backed grouping of monarchists and other opponents of the October Revolution) and then the Bolsheviks as part of the Revolutionary Insurgent Army of Ukraine led by Nestor Makhno, who established an anarchist society in the region for a number of months.

In the 1920s and 1930s, the rise of fascism in Europe transformed anarchism's conflict with the state. In Spain, the CNT initially refused to join a popular front electoral alliance, and abstention by CNT supporters led to a right-wing election victory. In 1936, the CNT changed its policy and anarchist votes helped bring the popular front back to power. Months later, the former ruling class responded with an attempted coup causing the Spanish Civil War (1936–1939). In response to the army rebellion, an anarchist-inspired movement of peasants and workers, supported by armed militias, took control of Barcelona and of large areas of rural Spain where they collectivised the land. But even before the fascist victory in 1939, the anarchists were losing ground in a bitter struggle with the Stalinists, who controlled the distribution of military aid to the Republican cause from the Soviet Union. Stalinist-led troops suppressed the collectives and persecuted both dissident Marxists and anarchists.

A surge of popular interest in anarchism occurred during the 1960s and 1970s. In 1968 in Carrara, Italy the International of Anarchist Federations was founded during an international Anarchist conference in Carrara in 1968 by the three existing European federations of France, the Italian and the Iberian Anarchist Federation as well as the Bulgarian federation in French exile. In the United Kingdom this was associated with the punk rock movement, as exemplified by bands such as Crass and the Sex Pistols. The housing and employment crisis in most of Western Europe led to the formation of communes and squatter movements like that of Barcelona, Spain. In Denmark, squatters occupied a disused military base and declared the Freetown Christiania, an autonomous haven in central Copenhagen.

Since the revival of anarchism in the mid 20th century, a number of new movements and schools of thought emerged. Around the turn of the 21st century, anarchism grew in popularity and influence as part of the anti-war, anti-capitalist, and anti-globalisation movements. Anarchists became known for their involvement in protests against the meetings of the World Trade Organization (WTO), Group of Eight, and the World Economic Forum. International anarchist federations in existence include the International of Anarchist Federations, the International Workers' Association, and International Libertarian Solidarity.

Mutualism 

Mutualism began in 18th-century English and French labor movements, then took an anarchist form associated with Pierre-Joseph Proudhon in France and others in the US. This influenced individualist anarchists in the United States such as Benjamin Tucker and William B. Greene. Josiah Warren proposed similar ideas in 1833 after participating in a failed Owenite experiment. In the 1840s and 1850s, Charles A. Dana, and William B. Greene introduced Proudhon's works to the US. Greene adapted Proudhon's mutualism to American conditions and introduced it to Benjamin R. Tucker.

Mutualist anarchism is concerned with reciprocity, free association, voluntary contract, federation, and credit and currency reform. Many mutualists believe a market without government intervention drives prices down to labor-costs, eliminating profit, rent, and interest according to the labor theory of value. Firms would be forced to compete over workers just as workers compete over firms, raising wages. Some see mutualism as between individualist and collectivist anarchism; in What Is Property?, Proudhon develops a concept of "liberty", equivalent to "anarchy", which is the dialectical "synthesis of communism and property." Greene, influenced by Pierre Leroux, sought mutualism in the synthesis of three philosophies – communism, capitalism and socialism. Later individualist anarchists used the term mutualism but retained little emphasis on synthesis, while social anarchists such as the authors of An Anarchist FAQ claim mutualism as a subset of their philosophical tradition.

Collectivist anarchism 

Collectivist anarchism is a revolutionary form of anarchism most commonly associated with Mikhail Bakunin, Johann Most and the anti-authoritarian section of the First International (1864–1876). Unlike mutualists, collectivist anarchists oppose all private ownership of the means of production, instead advocating that ownership be collectivized. This was to be initiated by small cohesive elite group through acts of violence, or "propaganda by the deed", which would inspire the workers to revolt and forcibly collectivize the means of production. Workers would be compensated for their work on the basis of the amount of time they contributed to production, rather than goods being distributed "according to need" as in anarcho-communism.

Although collectivist anarchism shares many similarities with anarchist communism there are also many key differences between them. For example, collectivist anarchists believe that the economy and most or all property should be collectively owned by society while anarchist communists by contrast believe that the concept of ownership should be rejected by society and replaced with the concept of usage. Also Collectivist anarchists often favor using a form of currency to compensate workers according to the amount of time spent contributing to society and production while anarcho-communists believe that currency and wages should be abolished all together and goods should be distributed "to each according to his or her need".

Anarcho-communism 

Anarcho-communists propose that a society composed of a number of self-governing communes with collective use of the means of production, with direct democracy as the political organizational form, and related to other communes through federation would be the freest form of social organisation. However, some anarcho-communists oppose the majoritarian nature of direct democracy, feeling that it can impede individual liberty and favor consensus democracy. Joseph Déjacque was an early anarcho-communist and the first person to describe himself as "libertarian". Other important anarcho-communists include Peter Kropotkin, Emma Goldman, Alexander Berkman and Errico Malatesta.

In anarcho-communism, individuals would not receive direct compensation for labour (through sharing of profits or payment), but would instead have free access to the resources and surplus of the commune. On the basis of his biological research and experimentation, Kropotkin believed that humans and human society are more inclined towards efforts for mutual benefit than toward competition and strife. Kropotkin believed that private property was one of the causes of oppression and exploitation and called for its abolition, but he only opposed ownership, not possession.

Some anarcho-syndicalists saw anarcho-communism as their objective. For example, the Spanish CNT adopted Isaac Puente's 1932 "Libertarian Communism" as its manifesto for a post-revolutionary society.

Anarcho-communism does not always have a communitarian philosophy. Some forms of anarcho-communism are egoist and strongly influenced by radical individualism believing that anarcho-communism does not require a communitarian nature at all. Forms of libertarian communism such as Situationism are strongly egoist in nature. Anarcho-communist Emma Goldman was influenced by both Stirner and Kropotkin and blended their philosophies together in her own, as shown in books of hers such as Anarchism And Other Essays.

Anarcho-syndicalism 

Anarcho-syndicalism is a branch of anarchism that focuses on the labor movement. Anarcho-syndicalists view labor unions as a potential force for revolutionary social change, replacing capitalism and the state with a new society democratically self-managed by workers.

The basic principles of anarcho-syndicalism are the following:
 Workers' solidarity
 Direct action
 Workers' self-management

Workers' solidarity means that anarcho-syndicalists believe all workers—no matter their race, gender, or ethnic group—are in a similar situation in regard to their boss (class consciousness). Furthermore, it means that, within capitalism, any gains or losses made by some workers from or to bosses will eventually affect all workers. Therefore, all workers must support one another in their class conflict to liberate themselves.

Anarcho-syndicalists believe that only direct action—that is, action concentrated on directly attaining a goal, as opposed to indirect action, such as electing a representative to a government position—will allow workers to liberate themselves. Moreover, anarcho-syndicalists believe that workers' organizations (the organizations that struggle against the wage system, which, in anarcho-syndicalist theory, will eventually form the basis of a new society) should be self-managing. They should not have bosses or "business agents"; rather, the workers should be able to make all the decisions that affect them themselves.

Rudolf Rocker was one of the most popular voices in the anarcho-syndicalist movement. He outlined a view of the origins of the movement, what it sought, and why it was important to the future of labor in his 1938 pamphlet Anarcho-Syndicalism. The International Workers Association is an international anarcho-syndicalist federation of various labor unions from different countries. The Spanish Confederación Nacional del Trabajo played and still plays a major role in the Spanish labor movement. It was also an important force in the Spanish Civil War.

Individualist anarchism 

Individualist anarchism is a set of several traditions of thought within the anarchist movement that emphasize the individual and their will over external determinants such as groups, society, traditions and ideological systems. Although usually contrasted to social anarchism, both individualist and social anarchism have influenced each other. Mutualism, an economy theory particularly influential within individualist anarchism whose pursued liberty has been called the synthesis of communism and property, has been considered sometimes part of individualist anarchism and other times part of social anarchism. Many anarcho-communists regard themselves as radical individualists, seeing anarcho-communism as the best social system for the realization of individual freedom. As a term, individualist anarchism is not a single philosophy, but it refers to a group of individualist philosophies that sometimes are in conflict. Among the early influences on individualist anarchism were William Godwin, Josiah Warren (sovereignty of the individual), Max Stirner (egoism), Lysander Spooner (natural law), Pierre-Joseph Proudhon (mutualism), Henry David Thoreau (transcendentalism), Herbert Spencer (law of equal liberty) and Anselme Bellegarrigue. From there, it expanded through Europe and the United States. Benjamin Tucker, a famous 19th-century individualist anarchist, held that "if the individual has the right to govern himself, all external government is tyranny". Tucker also argued that it was "not Socialist Anarchism against Individualist Anarchism, but of Communist Socialism against Individualist Socialism". The view of an individualist–socialist divide is contested as individualist anarchism is socialistic.

Josiah Warren is widely regarded as the first American anarchist and the four-page weekly paper he edited during 1833, The Peaceful Revolutionist, was the first anarchist periodical published. For American anarchist historian Eunice Minette Schuster, "[i]t is apparent [...] that Proudhonian Anarchism was to be found in the United States at least as early as 1848 and that it was not conscious of its affinity to the Individualist Anarchism of Josiah Warren and Stephen Pearl Andrews [...]. William B. Greene presented this Proudhonian Mutualism in its purest and most systematic form". Later, the American individualist anarchist Benjamin Tucker "was against both the state and capitalism, against both oppression and exploitation. While not against the market and property he was firmly against capitalism as it was, in his eyes, a state-supported monopoly of social capital (tools, machinery, etc.) which allows owners to exploit their employees, i.e., to avoid paying workers the full value of their labour. He thought that the "labouring classes are deprived of their earnings by usury in its three forms, interest, rent and profit", therefore "Liberty will abolish interest; it will abolish profit; it will abolish monopolistic rent; it will abolish taxation; it will abolish the exploitation of labour; it will abolish all means whereby any labourer can be deprived of any of his product". This stance puts him squarely in the libertarian socialist tradition and Tucker referred to himself many times as a socialist and considered his philosophy to be anarchistic socialism.

French individualist anarchist Émile Armand shows clearly opposition to capitalism and centralized economies when he said that the individualist anarchist "inwardly he remains refractory – fatally refractory – morally, intellectually, economically (The capitalist economy and the directed economy, the speculators and the fabricators of single are equally repugnant to him.)". The Spanish individualist anarchist Miguel Giménez Igualada thought that "capitalism is an effect of government; the disappearance of government means capitalism falls from its pedestal vertiginously...That which we call capitalism is not something else but a product of the State, within which the only thing that is being pushed forward is profit, good or badly acquired. And so to fight against capitalism is a pointless task, since be it State capitalism or Enterprise capitalism, as long as Government exists, exploiting capital will exist. The fight, but of consciousness, is against the State". His view on class division and technocracy are as follows: "Since when no one works for another, the profiteer from wealth disappears, just as government will disappear when no one pays attention to those who learned four things at universities and from that fact they pretend to govern men. Big industrial enterprises will be transformed by men in big associations in which everyone will work and enjoy the product of their work. And from those easy as well as beautiful problems anarchism deals with and he who puts them in practice and lives them are anarchists. [...] The priority which without rest an anarchist must make is that in which no one has to exploit anyone, no man to no man, since that non-exploitation will lead to the limitation of property to individual needs".

The anarchist writer and Bohemian Oscar Wilde wrote in his famous essay The Soul of Man under Socialism that "[a]rt is individualism, and individualism is a disturbing and disintegrating force. There lies its immense value. For what it seeks is to disturb monotony of type, slavery of custom, tyranny of habit, and the reduction of man to the level of a machine". For anarchist historian George Woodcock, "Wilde's aim in The Soul of Man under Socialism is to seek the society most favorable to the artist [...] for Wilde art is the supreme end, containing within itself enlightenment and regeneration, to which all else in society must be subordinated. [...] Wilde represents the anarchist as aesthete". In a socialist society, people will have the possibility to realise their talents as "each member of the society will share in the general prosperity and happiness of the society". Wilde added that "upon the other hand, Socialism itself will be of value simply because it will lead to individualism" since individuals will no longer need to fear poverty or starvation. This individualism would, in turn, protect against governments "armed with economic power as they are now with political power" over their citizens. However, Wilde advocated non-capitalist individualism, saying that "of course, it might be said that the Individualism generated under conditions of private property is not always, or even as a rule, of a fine or wonderful type" a critique which is "quite true". In Wilde's imagination, in this way socialism would free men from manual labour and allow them to devote their time to creative pursuits, thus developing their soul. He ended by declaring: "The new individualism is the new hellenism".

Democratic socialism 

Democratic socialism is a broad political movement that seeks to propagate the ideals of socialism within the context of a democratic system, as was done by Western social democrats, who popularized democratic socialism as a label to criticize the perceived authoritarian or non-democratic socialist development in the East, during the 19th and 20th centuries. In this sense, democratic socialism is closely related to social democracy and in some accounts are identical; other accounts stress differences, while maintaining that they are not mutually exclusive and can be compatible. Many democratic socialists support the system of social democracy as a road to reform of the capitalist system, while others support more revolutionary change in society to establish socialist goals. In the former sense, social democracy is considered to be more centrist and is more concerned of gradual improvements of the capitalist system, the mixed economy, and the welfare state, while some more radical social democrats, who describe themselves as democratic socialists, support a more anti-capitalist reformism, or through more radical evolutionary means, including revolutionary means.

Modern democratic socialists and social democrats both advocate the concept of the welfare state, at least to the extent that it protects and promotes the economic and social well-being of its citizens, including those unable to minimally provide for a good life. Whereas some modern social democrats view are more concern to gradually improve the welfare state, irrespective of any hierarchies of power that may persist following welfare reforms, which can and have been reversed by capital after the breakdown of the post-war compromise with labor, many modern democratic socialists view it as a means to an egalitarian end. Democratic socialists are also committed to the ideas of the redistribution of wealth and power as well as social ownership of certain industries, concepts which are considered to be abandoned by Third Way social democrats. Highlighting this difference, contemporary advocates of the democratic socialist model have criticized the modern Third Way social democratic approach of a welfare state if it is not adequately providing socioeconomic welfare programs at the universal level.

While there are no countries in the world that would qualify as a democratic socialist state, i.e. as a democratic state having achieved a post-capitalist, socialist economy, several academics, political commentators, and scholars have distinguished between authoritarian socialist and democratic socialist states, with the first representing the Soviet Bloc, which is considered as being authoritarian or non-democratic enough and as being socialist only constitutionally, and the latter representing Western Bloc countries which have been democratically governed by socialist parties such as Britain, France, Sweden, and Western social-democracies in general, among others, which have pushed the ideals and objectives of socialism within the context of a democratic political system and capitalist economic system. Some states have described as being democratic socialists. In other countries, democratic socialism is defined more generally, essentially equating economic rights with human rights. United States Senator Bernie Sanders, a proponent of democratic socialism, has defined the term as universally guaranteeing rights to quality health care, sufficient education, employment at a living wage, affordable housing, secure retirement, and a clean environment. Toward these ends, he has invoked the words of Martin Luther King Jr., who also advocated democratic socialism, in calling for "a better distribution of wealth".

Social democracy 

Social democracy can be divided into classical and modern strands. Classical social democracy attempts to achieve socialism through gradual, parliamentary means and by introducing it from within democracy rather than through revolutionary means. The term social democracy can refer to the particular kind of society that social democrats advocate.

The Socialist International (SI), the worldwide organization of social democratic and democratic socialist parties, defines social democracy as an ideal form of representative democracy that may solve the problems found in a liberal democracy. The SI emphasizes principles such as freedom—not only individual liberties, but also freedom from discrimination and freedom from dependence on either the owners of the means of production or the holders of abusive political power; equality and social justice—not only before the law, but also economic and socio-cultural equality as well equal opportunities for all, including those with physical, mental, or social disabilities; and solidarity—unity and a sense of compassion for the victims of injustice and inequality.

Modern social democracy seeks to contain capitalism through transitioning unstable private sector enterprises into public ownership, correcting economic and social inequality through social safety nets and services, sometimes referred to as welfare state policies, and more aggressive regulation of markets and private enterprise than other forms of mixed economy. Over the past forty years, social democracy has increasingly been replaced with alternate economic systems such as the social market economy or Third Way mixed economies that are informed by Keynesian economics.

Eco-socialism 

Merging aspects of Marxism, socialism, environmentalism, anarchism and ecology, eco-socialists generally believe that the capitalist system is the cause of social exclusion, inequality and environmental degradation. Eco-socialists criticise many within the green movement for not going far enough in their critique of the current world system and for not being overtly anti-capitalist. At the same time, Eco-socialists would blame the traditional Left for overlooking or not properly addressing ecological problems. Eco-socialists are anti-globalisation. Joel Kovel sees globalisation as a force driven by capitalism; in turn, the rapid economic growth encouraged by globalisation causes acute ecological crises.

Eco-socialism goes beyond a criticism of the actions of large corporations and targets the inherent properties of capitalism. Such an analysis follows Marx's theories about the contradiction between use values and exchange values. As Kovel explains, within a market economy, goods are not produced to meet needs but are produced to be exchanged for money that we then use to acquire other goods. As we have to keep selling to keep buying, we must persuade others to buy our goods just to ensure our survival, which leads to the production of goods with no previous use that can be sold to sustain our ability to buy other goods. Eco-socialists like Kovel stress that this contradiction has reached a destructive extent, where certain essential activities such as caring for relatives full-time and basic subsistence are unrewarded while unnecessary economic activities earn certain individuals huge fortunes. Agrarian socialism is another variant of eco-socialism.

Green anarchism 

Green anarchism puts a particular emphasis on environmental issues. An important early influence was the thought of the American individualist anarchist Henry David Thoreau and his book Walden. In the late 19th century, there emerged a naturist current within individualist anarchist circles in Cuba, France, Portugal and Spain.

Some contemporary green anarchists can be described as anti-civilization or primitivist anarchists, although not all green anarchists are primitivists. Similarly, there is a strong critique of modern technology among green anarchists, although not all reject it entirely. Important contemporary currents include anarcho-naturism as the fusion of anarchism and naturist philosophies; anarcho-primitivism which offers a critique of technology and argues that anarchism is best suited to uncivilised ways of life; eco-anarchism which combines older trends of primitivism as well as bioregional democracy, eco-feminism, intentional community, pacifism and secession that distinguish it from the more general green anarchism; green syndicalism, a green anarchist political stance made up of anarcho-syndicalist views; social ecology which argues that the hierarchical domination of nature by human stems from the hierarchical domination of human by human; and veganarchism which argues that human liberation and animal liberation are inseparable.

Liberal socialism 

Liberal socialism is a type of socialism that includes liberal principles within it. It supports a mixed economy that includes both social ownership and private property. Liberal socialism opposes laissez-faire economic liberalism and state socialism. It considers both liberty and equality as compatible with each other and mutually needed to achieve greater economic equality that is necessary to achieve greater economic liberty. The principles of liberal socialism have been based upon or developed by John Stuart Mill, Eduard Bernstein, G. D. H. Cole, John Dewey, Carlo Rosselli, Norberto Bobbio and Chantal Mouffe. Other important liberal socialist figures include Guido Calogero, Piero Gobetti, Leonard Trelawny Hobhouse and R. H. Tawney. Liberal socialism has been particularly prominent in British and Italian politics. Liberal socialist Carlo Rosselli founded the liberal socialist-led anti-fascist resistance movement Giustizia e Libertà that later became an active combatant against the Fascist regime in Italy during World War II and included Ferruccio Parri (who later became Prime Minister of Italy) who was among Giustizia e Libertà'''s leaders.

 Ethical socialism 

Ethical socialism is a variant of liberal socialism developed by British socialists.Noel W. Thompson. Political economy and the Labour Party: the economics of democratic socialism, 1884-2005. 2nd edition. Oxon, England, UK; New York, USA: Routledge, 2006. Pp. 52. It became an important ideology within the British Labour Party. Ethical socialism was founded in the 1920s by R. H. Tawney, a British Christian socialist, and its ideals were connected to Christian socialist, Fabian, and guild socialist ideals. Ethical socialism has been publicly supported by British Prime Ministers Ramsay MacDonald, Clement Attlee and Tony Blair.

 Libertarian socialism 

Libertarian socialism, sometimes called left-libertarianism,Hicks, Steven V. and Daniel E. Shannon. The American journal of economics and sociology. Blackwell Pub, 2003. p. 612 social anarchismChomsky, Noam (2004). Language and Politics. In Otero, Carlos Peregrín. AK Press. p. 739 and socialist libertarianism, is a political philosophy within the socialist movement that reject the view of socialism as state ownership or command of the means of production within a more general criticism of the state form itself"We do not equate socialism with planning, state control, or nationalization of industry, although we understand that in a socialist society (not "under" socialism) economic activity will be collectively controlled, managed, planned, and owned. Similarly, we believe that socialism will involve equality, but we do not think that socialism is equality, for it is possible to conceive of a society where everyone is equally oppressed. We think that socialism is incompatible with one-party states, with constraints on freedom of speech, with an elite exercising power 'on behalf of' the people, with leader cults, with any of the other devices by which the dying society seeks to portray itself as the new society. "What is Libertarian Socialism?" by Ulli Diemer. Volume 2, Number 1 (Summer 1997 issue) of The Red Menace. as well as of wage labour relationships within the workplace in the form of wage slavery. It emphasizes workers' self-management of the workplace and decentralized structures of political government, asserting that a society based on freedom and equality can be achieved through abolishing authoritarian institutions that control certain means of production and subordinate the majority to an owning class or political and economic elite. Libertarian socialists generally place their hopes in decentralized means of direct democracy and federal or confederal associations such as citizens' assemblies, libertarian municipalism, trade unions, and workers' councils. This is generally done within a general call for liberty and free association through the identification, criticism and practical dismantling of illegitimate authority in all aspects of human life.Anarchist historian George Woodcock report of Mikhail Bakunin's anti-authoritarianism and shows opposition to both state and non-state forms of authority as follows: "All anarchists deny authority; many of them fight against it." (p. 9)...Bakunin did not convert the League's central committee to his full program, but he did persuade them to accept a remarkably radical recommendation to the Berne Congress of September 1868, demanding economic equality and implicitly attacking authority in both Church and State."

Past and present political currents and movements commonly described as libertarian socialist include anarchism (anarcho-communism, anarcho-syndicalism, collectivist anarchism, mutualism individualist anarchism)French individualist anarchist Émile Armand shows clearly opposition to capitalism and centralized economies when he said that the individualist anarchist "inwardly he remains refractory – fatally refractory – morally, intellectually, economically (The capitalist economy and the directed economy, the speculators and the fabricators of single are equally repugnant to him.)""Anarchist Individualism as a Life and Activity" by Emile Armand"It introduces an eye-opening approach to radical social thought, rooted equally in libertarian socialism and market anarchism." Chartier, Gary; Johnson, Charles W. (2011). Markets Not Capitalism: Individualist Anarchism Against Bosses, Inequality, Corporate Power, and Structural Poverty. Brooklyn, NY:Minor Compositions/Autonomedia. Pg. Back cover as well as autonomism, communalism, libertarian Marxism (council communism and Luxemburgism) participism, revolutionary syndicalism and some versions of utopian socialism.

 Regional socialism 

Regional socialism include left-wing nationalism, a type of socialism based upon social equality, popular sovereignty and national self-determination, especially in relation to anti-imperialism and national liberation.Delanty, Gerard; Kumar, Krishan (2006). The SAGE Handbook of Nations and Nationalism. London, England; Thousand Oaks, California; New Delhi, India: Sage Publications, Ltd. p. 542.

 Abertzale left 

Abertzale left (Basque: ezker abertzalea, "patriotic left"; translated in Spanish as izquierda nacionalista radical vasca, "Basque radical nationalist left") is a term used to refer to the parties or organizations of the Basque nationalist/separatist left, stretching from social democracy to communism.

This leftist character is highlighted in contrast to the traditional jeltzale nationalism represented by the Basque Nationalist Party (EAJ-PNV), a conservative and Christian-democratic party, which has long been the largest in the Basque Country. The first examples of abertzale parties are the Basque Nationalist Republican Party (EAAE-PRNV), active from 1909 to 1913, and the Basque Nationalist Action (EAE-ANV), active from 1930 to 2008. This was the political environment in which ETA was formed. More recently, in 1986, the abertzale left of the EAJ-PNV wing to form the social-democratic Basque Solidarity (EA) party.Ezker abertzalea (Spanish: izquierda abertzale) is notably used when referring to the leftist-nationalist environment of Batasuna, an outlawed political party.

In 2011–2012, the main abertzale parties and groups joined forces in forming a succession of coalitions: Bildu, Amaiur and, finally, EH Bildu. A group of former members of Batasuna were identified by the media as independents of izquierda abertzale.

 Arab socialism 

The Arab Socialist Ba'ath Party rules Syria and has ruled Iraq under Saddam Hussein based on a tradition of secular, non-Marxist socialism. Ba'thist beliefs combine Arab socialism, nationalism, and pan-Arabism. The mostly secular ideology often contrasts with that of other Arab governments in the Middle East, which sometimes lean towards Islamism and theocracy. The Ba'athists have persecuted socialists in their own countries. In Iraq, the American Central Intelligence Agency assisted Iraq with a list of communists to eliminate, effectively wiping them out. Socialist Lynn Walsh argues that the Iraqi Ba'athists promoted capitalists from within the party and outside the country.

The Arab Socialist Ba'ath Party, also known as the Ba'ath Party, is a secularist pan-Arabist political party that synthesizes Arab nationalism and Arab socialism. It opposes Western imperialism and calls for the ethnic "awakening" or "resurrection" of the Arab people into a single united state. Ba'ath, also spelled as Ba'th or Baath, means resurrection or renaissance. The party's motto, "Unity, Liberty, Socialism" (wahda, hurriya, ishtirakiya), was inspired by the French Jacobin political doctrine linking national unity and social equity. In the slogan, "unity" refers to Arab unity, "liberty" emphasizes being free from foreign control and interference, and "socialism" refers to Arab socialism, not European-style Marxism or communism.

The party was founded in Damascus, Syria, in 1940 by the Syrian intellectuals Michel Aflaq and Salah al-Bitar, and since its inception, it has established branches in different Arab countries, although the only countries it has ever held power in are Syria and Iraq. Aflaq and al-Bitar both studied at the Sorbonne in the early 1930s, at a time when centre-left positivism was still the dominant ideology amongst France's academic elite. The Ba'ath party included a significant number of Christian Arabs among its founding members. For them, a resolutely nationalist and secular political framework was a suitable way to avoid a faith-based Islamic orientation and to give non-Muslims full acknowledgement as citizens.

In 1955, a coup d'état by the military against the historical leadership of Aflaq and al-Bitar led the Syrian and Iraqi parties to split into rival organizations—the Qotri (Regionalist) Syria-based party and the Qawmi (Nationalist) Iraq-based party. Both Ba'ath parties kept their names and maintained parallel structures, but became so antagonistic that the Syrian Ba'ath government became the only Arab government to support non-Arab Iran against Iraq during the Iran–Iraq War. In Syria, the Ba'ath Party has had a monopoly on political power since the party's 1963 coup. Ba'athists seized power in Iraq in 1963, but were deposed months later. They returned to power in a 1968 coup and remained the sole party of government until the 2003 Iraq invasion. Since then, the party has been banned in Iraq.

 Chinese and Vietnamese nationalist socialism 

The Kuomintang Party (Chinese National People's Party or Chinese Nationalist Party) was founded in the Republic of China in 1912 by Sun Yatsen, a proponent of Chinese nationalism, who founded Revive China Society in Honolulu, Hawaii, in 1894. Kuomintang ideology features Three Principles of the People, which are nationalism, democracy and socialism. The party has adopted a One-China policy, arguing that there is only one state called China, and that the Republic of China (not the People's Republic of China) is its legitimate government. The party has had conflicts with the Chinese Communist Party. Since 2008, in order to ease tensions with the People's Republic of China, the party has endorsed the "Three Noes" policy as defined by Ma Ying-jeou, namely no unification, no independence and no use of force.

The Kuomintang attempted to levy taxes upon merchants in Canton and the merchants resisted by raising an army, the Merchant's Volunteer Corps. The merchants were conservative and reactionary and their leader Chen Lianbao was a prominent comprador trader. Chiang Kai-shek led his army of Whampoa Military Academy graduates to defeat the merchant's army. He was assisted by Soviet advisors, who supplied him with weapons, while the merchants were supplied with weapons from the Western countries. The British led an international flotilla to support the merchants. Chiang seized the Western-supplied weapons from the merchants, and battled against them. A Kuomintang general executed several merchants, and the Kuomintang formed a Soviet-inspired Revolutionary Committee. The Kuomintang's economic and military campaign against merchants continued for many years. Chiang also enforced an anti-Japanese boycott, sending agents to sack the shops of those who sold Japanese-made items, fining them.

The Việt Nam Quốc Dân Đảng (VNQDĐ) was based on the Chinese Kuomintang, and incorporated socialism and nationalism as part of its ideology. The party sought independence from French colonial rule in Vietnam during the early 20th century. Its origins lie in the mid-1920s, when a group of young Hanoi-based intellectuals began publishing revolutionary material. From 1928, the VNQDĐ attracted attention through its assassinations of French officials and Vietnamese collaborators. During the 1930s, the party was eclipsed by Ho Chi Minh's Indochinese Communist Party (ICP). Vietnam was occupied by Japan during World War II and in the chaos that followed the Japanese surrender in 1945 the VNQDĐ and the ICP briefly joined forces in the fight for Vietnamese independence. After a falling out, Ho purged the VNQDĐ, leaving his communist-dominated Viet Minh unchallenged as the foremost anti-colonial militant organisation. As a part of the post-war settlement that ended the First Indochina War, Vietnam was partitioned into two zones. The remnants of the VNQDĐ fled to the anti-communist south, where they remained until the Fall of Saigon in 1975 and the reunification of Vietnam under communist rule.

 Irish republican socialism 
Socialism has traditionally been part of the Irish republican movement since the early 20th century, when James Connolly, an Irish Marxist theorist, took part in the Easter Rising of 1916. Today, most Irish nationalist and Republican organizations located in Northern Ireland advocate some form of socialism, both Marxist and non-Marxist. The Social Democratic and Labour Party which until recently was the largest nationalist party in Northern Ireland promotes social democracy while militant Republican parties such as Sinn Féin, Republican Sinn Féin, and the 32 County Sovereignty Movement all promote their own varieties of democratic socialism intended to re-distribute wealth on an all-island basis once a united Ireland has been achieved. The Irish Republican Socialist Movement, encompassing the Irish Republican Socialist Party and Irish National Liberation Army as well as the defunct Official Irish Republican Army and Irish National Liberation Front are known for promoting an ideology which combines Marxist–Leninism with traditional revolutionary militant Republicanism and is said to be the most direct fulfillment of Connolly's legacy.

 Religious socialism 

Religious socialism is any form of socialism based on religious values. Members of several major religions have found that their beliefs about human society fit with socialist principles and ideas. As a result, religious socialist movements have developed within these religions.

 Buddhist socialism 

Buddhist socialism is a political ideology which advocates socialism based on the principles of Buddhism. Both Buddhism and socialism seek to provide an end to suffering by analyzing its conditions and removing its main causes through praxis. Both also seek to provide a transformation of personal consciousness (respectively, spiritual and political) to bring an end to human alienation and selfishness.
People who have been described as Buddhist socialists include Buddhadasa Bhikkhu, B. R. Ambedkar S. W. R. D. Bandaranaike, Han Yong-un, Seno’o Girō, U Nu, Uchiyama Gudō, and Norodom Sihanouk.

Bhikkhu Buddhadasa coined the phrase "Dhammic socialism". He believed that socialism is a natural state, meaning all things exist together in one system. Han Yong-un felt that equality was one of the main principles of Buddhism. In an interview published in 1931, Yong-un spoke of his desire to explore Buddhist socialism: "I am recently planning to write about Buddhist socialism. Just like there is Christian socialism as a system of ideas in Christianity, there must be also Buddhist socialism in Buddhism".

Tenzin Gyatso, the Fourteenth Dalai Lama of Tibet has said that "[o]f all the modern economic theories, the economic system of Marxism is founded on moral principles, while capitalism is concerned only with gain and profitability. [...] The failure of the regime in the former Soviet Union was, for me, not the failure of Marxism but the failure of totalitarianism. For this reason I still think of myself as half-Marxist, half-Buddhist".

 Christian socialism 

There are individuals and groups, past and present, that are clearly both Christian and socialist, such as Frederick Denison Maurice, author of The Kingdom of Christ (1838), and the Christian Socialist Movement (UK) (CSM), affiliated with the British Labour Party. Distributism, is a third-way economic philosophy formulated by such Catholic thinkers as G. K. Chesterton and Hilaire Belloc to apply the principles of social justice articulated by the Roman Catholic Church, especially in Pope Leo XIII's encyclical Rerum novarum.

Various Catholic clerical parties have at times referred to themselves as Christian Social. Two examples are the Christian Social Party of Karl Lueger in Austria before and after World War I, and the contemporary Christian Social Union in Bavaria. Yet these parties have never espoused socialist policies and have always stood at the conservative side of Christian Democracy. Hugo Chávez of Venezuela was an advocate of a form of Christian socialism as he claims that Jesus Christ was a socialist.

Christian anarchism is a movement in political theology that combines anarchism and Christianity. The foundation of Christian anarchism is a rejection of violence, with Leo Tolstoy's The Kingdom of God Is Within You regarded as a key text. Tolstoy sought to separate Russian Orthodox Christianity—which was merged with the state—from what he believed was the true message of Jesus as contained in the Gospels, specifically in the Sermon on the Mount. Tolstoy takes the viewpoint that all governments who wage war, and churches who in turn support those governments, are an affront to the Christian principles of nonviolence and nonresistance. Although Tolstoy never actually used the term Christian anarchism in The Kingdom of God Is Within You, reviews of this book following its publication in 1894 appear to have coined the term.

Christian anarchist groups have included the Doukhobors, Catholic Worker Movement and the Brotherhood Church.

Christian communism is a form of religious communism based on Christianity. It is a theological and political theory based upon the view that the teachings of Jesus Christ compel Christians to support communism as the ideal social system. Although there is no universal agreement on the exact date when Christian communism was founded, many Christian communists assert that evidence from the Bible (in the Acts of the Apostles) suggests that the first Christians, including the apostles, established their own small communist society in the years following Jesus' death and resurrection. As such, many advocates of Christian communism argue that it was taught by Jesus and practiced by the apostles themselves. Some independent historians confirm it.

 Islamic socialism 

Islamic socialism incorporates Islamic principles to socialism. As a term, it was coined by various Muslim leaders to describe a more spiritual form of socialism. Scholars have highlighted the similarities between the Islamic economic system and socialist theory as both socialism and Islam are against unearned income. Muslim socialists believe that the teachings of the Quran and Muhammad—especially the zakat—are compatible with principles of socialism. They draw inspiration from the early Medinan welfare state established by Muhammad. Muslim socialists found their roots in anti-imperialism. Muslim socialist leaders believe in the derivation of legitimacy from the public.

Islamic socialism is the political ideology of Libya's Muammar al-Gaddafi, former Iraqi president Ahmed Hassan al-Bakr, Syrian President Hafez Al-Assad and of the Pakistani leader of Pakistan Peoples Party, Zulfikar Ali Bhutto. The Green Book (written by Muammar al-Gaddafi) consists of three parts, namely "The Solution of the Problem of Democracy: 'The Authority of the People'", "The Solution of the Economic Problem: 'Socialism'", and "The Social Basis of the Third Universal Theory". The book is controversial because it completely rejects modern conceptions of liberal democracy and encourages the institution of a form of direct democracy based on popular committees. Critics charge that Qaddafi uses these committees as tools of autocratic political repression in practice.

 Jewish socialism 

The Jewish left consists of Jews who identify with, or support, left-wing or liberal causes, consciously as Jews, either as individuals or through organizations. There is no one organization or movement which constitutes the Jewish left, however. Jews have been major forces in the history of the labor movement, the settlement house movement, the women's rights movement, anti-racist and anti-colonialist work, and anti-fascist and anti-capitalist organizations of many forms in Europe, the United States, Algeria, Iraq, Ethiopia, and modern-day Israel.Hannah Borenstein, "Savior Story": "The violence of the late 1970s and early 1980s Ethiopia spurred many forms of active and comprehensive resistance. Ethiopian Jews participated widely; many, for instance, were members of the Marxist–Leninist EPRP." Jews have a rich history of involvement in anarchism, socialism, Marxism, and Western liberalism. Although the expression "on the left" covers a range of politics, many well-known figures "on the left" have been of Jews who were born into Jewish families and have various degrees of connection to Jewish communities, Jewish culture, Jewish tradition, or the Jewish religion in its many variants.

Labor Zionism or socialist Zionism (translit. Tziyonut sotzyalistit;  translit. Tnu'at ha'avoda, i.e. The labor movement) is the left wing of the Zionist movement. For many years, it was the most significant tendency among Zionists and Zionist organizations. It saw itself as the Zionist sector of the historic Jewish labor movements of Eastern and Central Europe, eventually developing local units in most countries with sizable Jewish populations. Unlike the "political Zionist" tendency founded by Theodor Herzl and advocated by Chaim Weizmann, Labor Zionists did not believe that a Jewish state would be created simply by appealing to the international community or to a powerful nation such as Britain, Germany or the Ottoman Empire. Rather, Labor Zionists believed that a Jewish state could only be created through the efforts of the Jewish working class settling in the Land of Israel and constructing a state through the creation of a progressive Jewish society with rural kibbutzim and moshavim and an urban Jewish proletariat.

Labor Zionism grew in size and influence and eclipsed "political Zionism" by the 1930s both internationally and within the British Mandate of Palestine where Labor Zionists predominated among many of the institutions of the pre-independence Jewish community Yishuv, particularly the trade union federation known as the Histadrut. The Haganah, the largest Zionist paramilitary defense force, was a Labor Zionist institution and was used on occasion (such as during the Hunting Season) against right-wing political opponents or to assist the British Administration in capturing rival Jewish militants. Labor Zionists played a leading role in the 1948 Arab–Israeli War and Labor Zionists were predominant among the leadership of the Israeli military for decades after the formation of the state of Israel in 1948.

Major theoreticians of the Labor Zionist movement included Moses Hess, Nachman Syrkin, Ber Borochov, and Aaron David Gordon and leading figures in the movement included David Ben-Gurion, Golda Meir, and Berl Katznelson.

 Syndicalism 

Syndicalism is a radical current in the labor movement that was most active in the early 20th century. Its main idea is the establishment of local worker-based organizations and the advancement of the demands and rights of workers through strikes. According to the Marxist historian Eric Hobsbawm, it was predominant in the revolutionary left in the decade which preceded the outbreak of World War I because Marxism was mostly reformist at that time.

Major syndicalist organizations included the General Confederation of Labor in France, the National Confederation of Labor in Spain, the Italian Syndicalist Union, the Free Workers' Union of Germany, and the Argentine Regional Workers' Federation. Although they did not regard themselves as syndicalists, the Industrial Workers of the World, the Irish Transport and General Workers' Union and the Canadian One Big Union are considered by most historians to belong to this current.

A number of syndicalist organizations were and still are to this day linked in the International Workers' Association, but some of its member organizations left for the International Confederation of Labor, formed in 2018.

 See also 

 Anarchism
 Anarchist economics
 Anarchist schools of thought
 Authoritarian socialism
 Christian socialism
 Communism
 Democratic socialism
 Ethical socialism
 History of anarchism
 History of communism
 History of socialism
 Labour movement
 "The labor problem"
 Left-libertarianism
 Liberal socialism
 Libertarianism
 Libertarian socialism
 List of communist ideologies
 Market socialism
 Marxian economics
 Marxism
 Marxist schools of thought
 Mutualism (economic theory)
 Reformism
 Revolutionary socialism
 Social democracy
 Socialism
 Socialist economics
 Socialist mode of production
 Socialist state
 State socialism
 Syndicalism

 References 

 Further reading 
 G. D. H. Cole, History of Socialist Thought, in 7 volumes, Macmillan and St. Martin's Press (1965), Palgrave Macmillan (2003 reprint); 7 volumes, hardcover, 3160 pages, .
 Albert Fried, Ronald Sanders, eds., Socialist Thought: A Documentary History, Garden City, New York: Doubleday Anchor, 1964.
 Michael Harrington, Socialism, New York, Bantam, 1972.
 James Weinstein, Long Detour: The History and Future of the American Left, Westview Press, 2003, hardcover, 272 pages, .
 .
  (see review here).
 What Remains of Socialism? by Emile Perreau-Saussine.

 External links 
 Heaven on Earth: the Rise and Fall of Socialism by the PBS
 History of Socialism by the Spartacus Educational
 The Two Souls of Socialism by Hal Draper
 Socialism: Utopian and Scientific by Frederick Engels
 Types of socialism from The Communist Manifesto''

 
Socialism